Giuseppe Romani (c. 1654 – 1718) was an Italian painter of the Baroque era.

There are very few information available about the life of this artist born in Como, Italy, although many paintings of his still survive. It is not certain if Romani can be identified with the "Joseph Romani", an Italian artist active in Madrid, described by Antonio Palomino in his An account of the lives and works of the most eminent Spanish painters, sculptors and architects.

References

External links
Paintings by Giuseppe Romani

17th-century Italian painters
Italian male painters
18th-century Italian painters
Italian Baroque painters
1654 births
1718 deaths
18th-century Italian male artists